Vitan is a neighborhood in southeastern Bucharest, Romania, along the Dâmbovița River. It is located in Sector 3, and lies between the Titan, Dristor, Centrul Civic, Olteniței, and Berceni districts. 

According to Dimitrie Papazoglu, its name comes from the Vitan Plain, where the cattle of the townspeople once grazed, while according to historian Adrian Majuru, the neighborhood's name comes from the name of a property owner, whose estate subsequently became a village that was later incorporated into the city. Though it is one of the oldest neighborhoods of Bucharest, it was for a long time notorious for its poverty. The Bucharest Mall is situated in the north side of the neighborhood. The neighborhood was mostly erased to allow for prefabricated apartment buildings to be constructed on their site between 1986 and 1992, with typical architecture of the era (buildings inspired from North Korean designs). Previously, the only new buildings in the area were the Vitan Post Office (1956) and Polyclinic (1967).

References

Districts of Bucharest